The Ancient Bristlecone Pine Forest is a protected area high in the White Mountains in Inyo County in eastern California.

Geography
The forest is east of the Owens Valley, high on the eastern face of the White Mountains in the upper Fish Lake-Soda Spring Watershed, above the northernmost reach of the Mojave Desert into Great Basin ecotone. The forest's mountain habitat is in the Central Basin and Range ecoregion (EPA) and Taiga and Boreal forest ecoregion (WWF). The Patriarch Grove is the source of Cottonwood Creek, a designated Wild and Scenic River.

Ecology

The Great Basin bristlecone pine (Pinus longaeva) trees grow between 9,800 and 11,000 feet (3,000–3,400 m) above sea level, in xeric alpine conditions, protected within the Inyo National Forest.  Limber pine (Pinus flexilis) also grow in the forest.

Methuselah
The Methuselah Grove in the Ancient Bristlecone Pine Forest is the location of the "Methuselah", a Great Basin bristlecone pine that is  years old. It is considered to be the world's oldest known and confirmed living non-clonal organism.  It was temporarily superseded by a 5,062 year old bristlecone pine discovered in 2010. In May 2017 however, Dr. Peter Brown removed this tree from his database of old trees because the tree and core sample could not be found. "Methuselah" is not marked in the forest, to ensure added protection from vandals.

Visiting

The Ancient Bristlecone Pine Forest is generally open from mid-May through the end of November, weather permitting.
Schulman Grove and Schulman Grove Visitor Centerdaily interpretive talks and natural history lectures mid-June through Labor Day, and hiking trails.
Patriarch Grovehome of the world's largest bristlecone pine, the Patriarch Tree, and a self-guided nature trail.

Methuselah Grove trail
The Methuselah Grove trail starts from the visitor center at 9,846 feet and makes a 4.5-mile (7.2 km) loop that includes the side valley of the Methuselah Grove where the oldest tree lives, a high section looking out eastward over Nevada's basin-and-range region, and side trails to old mining sites. Numbered natural-history markers are explained by a booklet.

Fire 
On September 4, 2008, an arsonist set fire to the Schulman Grove Visitor Center and several bristlecone pines. The building and all the exhibits within were destroyed. Activities to rebuild the center began the next day and are now complete.

References

 -

External links 

 – Inyo National Forest official Ancient Bristlecone Pine Forest site
 – Inyo National Forest: The Natural History of the Bristlecone Pines

Forests of California
Inyo National Forest
White Mountains (California)
Taiga and boreal forests in the United States
Protected areas of Inyo County, California
Protected areas of the Great Basin
Plant communities of California
Pinus longaeva
Pinus longaeva
Natural history of California
Landmarks in California